Wayne Henderson (born 28 June 1944) is a Canadian former alpine skier who competed in the 1968 Winter Olympics.

References

1944 births
Living people
Canadian male alpine skiers
Olympic alpine skiers of Canada
Alpine skiers at the 1968 Winter Olympics
Place of birth missing (living people)